Carlier Springs is a spring in Floyd County, in the U.S. state of Georgia.

Carlier Springs was named for Louis Carlier, an early settler.

References

Bodies of water of Floyd County, Georgia
Springs of Georgia (U.S. state)